Asura lutara is a moth of the family Erebidae first described by Frederic Moore in 1860. It is found in Myanmar, Perak, Borneo, Sumatra and Java.

References

lutara
Moths described in 1860
Moths of Asia